OLP may refer to:

Off-line programming (robotics) 
Our Lady Peace, a Canadian alternative rock band
Our Lady of Peace (disambiguation)
OLP Guitars
Ontario Liberal Party, a provincial political party in Ontario, Canada
Royal Mail Online Postage, a service provided by Royal Mail in the UK
Ordinal linguistic personification, the sense that ordered sequences have personalities
Open License Program, a Microsoft volume license service
Oral lichen planus of the oral mucosa 

Places
Old Loggers Path, Pennsylvania, USA
Olympic Dam Airport (IATA airport code: OLP) in South Australia
Olp, a village within Sort municipal term, Pallars Sobirà, Spain

See also